Moxy II is the second studio album by the Canadian hard rock and heavy metal band Moxy, released in 1976. It was recorded at Sound Stage studio in April 1976 in Toronto with Jack Douglas producing. Two songs from the album entered the charts in Canada, "Take It Or Leave  It" that reached number 14 and "Cause There's Another" that reached  number 16 on the Top 30 on CHUM (AM) in Toronto, and the KISS-FM Texas hits "Midnight Flight" and "One More Heartbreak". The album sold well because of strong live appearances that included tours with Black Sabbath, Boston and  Triumph  with heavy promotion by the label (Polydor) (Mercury Records). The album was highly acclaimed on release by Geoff Barton in the UK music publication, Sounds, following which the magazine made the album available to readers for the special price of £1.50.

Credits 
 Buzz Shearman - vocals 
 Earl Johnson - guitar, slide guitar 
 Buddy Caine -	guitar, blowbag and acoustic guitar
 Terry Juric - bass guitar
 Bill Wade - drums, percussion  
 Mika Sharun - backing vocals  
 Steve Byron - backing vocals, assistant 
 The Wisconsin Kid - backing vocals
 Edward Leonetti - producer 
 Jack Douglas - producer 
 Jay Messina - mixing, mixing engineer 
 Lee DeCarlo - engineer
 Recorded April 1976 at Sound Stage Studio
 Mixed May 1976 at The Record Plant, New York City

Track listing 
 "Cause There's Another" - 3:45 (Buddy Caine, Buzz Shearman)
 "Take it or Leave It" - 3:43 (Buddy Caine, Buzz Shearman)
 "Through the Storm" - 4:00 (Earl Johnson)
 "One More Heartbreak" - 2:38(Earl Johnson)
  "Slippin' Out" - 4:02 (Earl Johnson, Bill Wade, Terry Juric)
  "Midnight Flight" - 3:30 (Earl Johnson)
  "Change in My Life" - 4:38 (Buzz Shearman, Buddy Caine)
  "Tryin' Just for You" - 4:30 (Buzz Shearman, Buddy Caine)
  "Wet Suit" - 4:54 (Buzz Shearman, Buddy Caine, Terry Juric, Bill Wade, The Wisconsin Kid)

Reissued 
Moxy's original catalogue of albums was again available starting in 1993 when Valerie Shearman ("Buzz" widow) oversaw the release of all of Moxy's back catalogue of albums on CD by Pacemaker Records, again starting in 2003 by Unidisc Music Inc. and in 2009 by Cyclone records Canada.

References

External links 
 Moxy official website

1976 albums
Moxy (band) albums
Albums produced by Jack Douglas (record producer)
Mercury Records albums